Laura Hope may refer to:
 Laura Lee Hope, a pseudonym used for several series of children's novels
 Laura Margaret Hope, Australia's first woman surgeon